James Barnhill, (born 1955) is an American artist and sculptor, best known for his commissioned statues and public monuments. He currently lives and works in Greensboro, North Carolina, and is an art professor at the North Carolina Agricultural and Technical State University. His sculpture work spans more than three decades.

Gallery

Major works 
Barnhill's website includes many images of his public works. The most notable include:
 General Greene (2007) Greensboro, NC
 February One (also referred to as the A&T Four Monument or the Greensboro Four Monument) (2002) Greensboro, NC
 The Angel of Montoursville (also referred to as the Montoursville Angel or the TWA Crash Memorial) (1999) Montoursville, PA
 The Story (1999) Hickory, NC
 Civitas (1997) Mountain Brook, AL
 Bust of Booker T. Washington (1996) near Hardy, VA at the Booker T. Washington National Monument
 Little Sipper (1994) Asheville, NC

References

External links 
 James Barnhill

20th-century American sculptors
20th-century American male artists
1955 births
Artists from Asheville, North Carolina
Living people
Sculptors from North Carolina
21st-century American sculptors
21st-century American male artists
American male sculptors
University of North Carolina at Greensboro alumni
North Carolina A&T State University faculty